St John's wort, Hypericum perforatum, is a flowering plant in the family Hypericaceae.

Saint John's wort or variants may also refer to:

 Hypericum, the genus of plants
 Hypericum pulchrum, slender Saint-John's-wort

See also
 Otogirisō, lit. St John's wort, a 1992 sound novel video game
 Otogirisō (film) a 2001 film based on the game